Time Will Tell Our Story was released by folk music duo The Gordons in 2002. It was produced by Gary Gordon and Roberta Gordon. It was engineered by Mark Stoffel at Roan Pony Studio in Murphysboro, Illinois; Tim Carter at TreeHouse Studio in Ridgetop, Tennessee; and Mark Howard at Signal Path in Nashville, Tennessee. It was also mixed by Mark Howard. It was mastered by David Shipley at Foxwood Mastering and Editing in Nashville, Tennessee.

Track listing
"Make Believe" (G. Gordon) - 3:34 
"Gone Gonna Rise Again" (Si Kahn) - 4:49
"The Flood" (G. Gordon) - 3:18
"Worth It To Watch 'Em Run" (Noah Gordon) - 2:05 
"Cottonmill" (Holly Tashian, R. Gordon) - 4:00
"Ashland Breakdown" (Bill Monroe) - 3:25 
"Sweet Time" (R. Gordon) - 3:24 
"Better Place" (R. Gordon, G. Gordon) - 3:51 
"Follow Mother Home" (R. Gordon, G. Gordon) - 4:15
"Goin' Home" (R. Gordon, G. Gordon) - 2:57 
"John Barleycorn" (Traditional; arr. and adapt. by G. Gordon) - 8:02
"She Loves Her Children So" (R. Gordon, G. Gordon) - 2:16 
"Time Will Tell Our Story" (G. Gordon, R. Gordon) - 4:17
"I Believe" (R. Gordon, G. Gordon) - 3:15

Personnel

The Gordons
Gary Gordon – vocals, guitar
Roberta Gordon – vocals, autoharp

Additional personnel
Robert Bowlin – fiddle
Bill Cross - banjo
Holly Tashian - harmony
Alison Brown - banjo
Curtis Jay - bass
Mark Stoffel - mandolin
Noah Gordon - vocals
Ross Sermons - bass
Wil Maring - bass
Katsuyaki Miyazaki - mandolin

References

2002 albums
The Gordons (duo) albums